The Assumption or Dormition Cathedral was the main Orthodox church of Kharkiv until the construction of the Annunciation Cathedral in 1901. The cathedral stands on the University Hill by the bank of the Lopan River and dominates the entire downtown. The Neoclassical cathedral bell tower, built in the 1820s and 1830s to a height of 90 meters, remained the tallest building in the city until the 21st century.  The cathedral is the only building in Kharkiv visited by almost all Russian Emperors starting with Catherine the Great.

History

17th century 

In 1656 when the Kharkiv Fortress was rebuilt most of its territory was given to the citizens to build their houses. The northern part of the district was given for construction of the future church. It is first mentioned in a 1658 military report of the voivode Ofrosimov, who wrote to Moscow about shipments of wood for the construction. That church was austere and only had paper icons. Research of later centuries discovered multiple human remains near the church that proves it had its own cemetery nearby.

Kharkiv was growing rapidly and by 1685 the city authorities started construction of the stone Assumption church. The old wooden church was preserved as a small chapel. By 1687 the new building was ready. The Assumption church was consecrated in 1688 by the Belgorod Metropolitan Archbishop Avramiy. It became one of the first stone buildings in the city.

18th century 
On March 3, 1733, Kharkiv suffered the most disastrous fire in its history. It destroyed more than 300 households with all buildings, all shops, ruined the St Nicholas church and  almost burned down the Assumption church. Only its walls remained intact while all the interiors, the roof and domes were destroyed. However, by 1734 the church was restored.

In 1770 dangerous cracks were found in the church walls that could not be repaired. On May 14, 1771, a cornerstone for the new cathedral was laid. The design of the future building was inspired by the St Clement's Church in Moscow. In Spring 1778 the altar was consecrated in honor of Our Lady of Kazan, though the construction was not completed yet. On September 27, 1780, it was reconsecrated in honor of Dormition. The ceremony was attended by the general Pyotr Rumyantsev.

The cathedral was built when the pompous Baroque style was going out of fashion and was gradually replaced by classicism. The eclectic combination of those styles showed itself in the cathedral. It boasted a gilded icon screen, carved from limewood to Rastrelli's Rococo design, in Baroque fashion and at the same time the facades were reserved and strict.

19th century 

According to Filaret Gumilevsky, the free-standing Alexander Bell Tower was built in the aftermath of Napoleon's expulsion from Russia "to express the people's gratitude to Alexander I". The cornerstone was laid on August 2, 1821. The main altar was consecrated on November 5, 1833. On October 1, 1841, the gilded cross crafted by Moscow master Lukinov was installed on the bell tower.

The tower used to be the second tallest building in Ukraine after the Great Lavra Bell Tower. The seat of the local bishop was moved from the older Intercession Cathedral to the Dormition Church in 1846. A large French clock was installed in the bell tower in 1856. Overall, more than 110,000 rubles were spent on the construction.

20th century 
In 1924 the bell tower as the highest building of the city was used to install an antenna for the first Soviet radio station. Later the transmission device was moved inside, and the frescoes were significantly damaged. The authorities closed the cathedral on February 17, 1930. All five domes were destroyed, the bells were removed from the tower. The building was used as a warehouse, then it was given to the city administration offices.

The belfry was further damaged by a tornado in 1975. The cathedral was restored in the late 1970s and reverted to the Ukrainian Orthodox Church in 2006. The local bishopric shares it with a philharmonic society which had a Rieger–Kloss organ installed in the building back in 1986.

21st century 
During 2022 Russian invasion of Ukraine, on March 2, 2022, Russian missile hit the church where civilians were hiding from the bombings.

Gallery

See also 
 Annunciation Cathedral, Kharkiv
 List of tallest Orthodox churches

References

Sources

External links 
 

Eastern Orthodox cathedrals in Ukraine
Cathedrals in Kharkiv
Ukrainian Orthodox Church (Moscow Patriarchate) cathedrals
18th-century Eastern Orthodox church buildings
Churches completed in 1780
Baroque architecture in Ukraine
Church buildings with domes
Buildings and structures destroyed during the 2022 Russian invasion of Ukraine
Neoclassical church buildings in Ukraine